Ann Airport  is an airport located at Ann, Rakhine State of Myanmar.

Airlines and destinations

References

Airports in Myanmar